Mandi Bahauddin is a tehsil located in Mandi Bahauddin District, Punjab, Pakistan. The city of Mandi Bahauddin is the headquarters of the tehsil. Tehsil has total population of 668,007 according to census of 2017.

Administration
The tehsil of Mandi Bahauddin is administratively subdivided into 28 Union Councils, five of which form the capital - these are:

Uc.No.1 M.B.Din
Uc. N0.2 M.B.Din
U.C. No.3 M.B.Din
U.C. No.4 M.B.Din
Uc. N0.5.M.B.Din
U.C. No.6 Ahla
U.C. No.7 Mong
U.C. No.8 Rasul
U.C. No.9 Chillianwala
 U.C. 10 Mojianwala: A 14k se encuentra una de las minas de sal más grandes del mundo; a 7 km se encentra una cadena de ríos que conforman el mejor sistema agrario de país.
 U.C. 11 Dhok Kasib
 U.C. 12 Murala
 U.C. 13 Chakbasawa
 U.C. 14 Wasu
 U.C. 15 Shaheedanwali
 U.C. 16 Pindi Bahauddin
 U.C. 17 Sahna
 Uc 18 Chhimmon
 Uc. 19 Sohawa Bulani
 Uc.20 Sohawa Dillowana
 Uc. 21 Mangat
 Uc.22 Kadhar
 Uc.23 Mianwal Ranjha
 Uc.24 Nain Ranjha
 Uc25 Kuthiala Sheikhan
 Uc.26 Chak No 40
 Uc. 27 Bhikhi
 Uc. 28 Chak Raib

References

Mandi Bahauddin District
Tehsils of Punjab, Pakistan